Reginald Ridley (23 March 1883 – 27 October 1971) was a New Zealand cricketer. He played in two first-class matches for Canterbury from 1905 to 1907.

See also
 List of Canterbury representative cricketers

References

External links
 

1883 births
1971 deaths
New Zealand cricketers
Canterbury cricketers
Cricketers from Christchurch